Deh-e Ziaratan (also Romanized as Deh-e Zīāratān) is a village in Senderk Rural District, Senderk District, Minab County, Hormozgan Province, Iran. At the 2006 census, its population was 51 residents across 12 families.

References 

Populated places in Minab County